INS Surat is the fourth and last ship of the  stealth guided-missile destroyers of the Indian Navy. 

Initially, the ship was speculated to be named after port city Porbandar but later it was changed to Surat.

Construction
The keel of Surat was laid down in 2018. Built at two different geographical locations using the block construction methodology  involving hull construction and joining together at MDL. Successor of P15A destroyers,  Project 15B is the next generation of stealth guided missile destroyers.

Surat was launched on 17 May 2022 by Mazagon Dock Limited. The ship is expected to be commissioned by 2025.

See also

List of active Indian Navy ships
List of destroyers of India
Future of the Indian Navy

References

Visakhapatnam-class destroyers
Destroyers of the Indian Navy
Ships built in India